Shafi Imam Rumi (29 March 1951 – 30 September 1971) was a guerilla fighter of the Bangladesh Liberation War. He was the eldest son of Jahanara Imam. In her memoir about the war, Ekatorer Dinguli, Rumi was portrayed as the premier character. Rumi was murdered by the Pakistani Army

Early life
Rumi was born on 29 March 1951 in the higher middle-class family of Jahanara and Sharif Imam. He started his education at a local kindergarten school in Azimpur. Rumi passed his matriculation from Adamjee Cantonment Public School & College in 1968. He stood third in the Pakistan Education Board. During his college days, Rumi joined the University Officers Training Corps along with his friends. He was later promoted to the rank of Sergeant. By March 1971, he completed his H.S.C. and got admitted in Engineering College (currently BUET). He was also enrolled into Illinois Institute of Technology but did not attend due to the war.

Bangladesh Liberation War

During the earlier part of the war, Rumi constantly attempted to convince his mother for giving him the permission to attend the war. As his mother finally agreed on 19 April 1971, Rumi compiled his first attempt to cross the border to India on 2 May. But he had to come back for adverse situation and became successful in his second try. He took training for the war in Melaghar, Agartala under Sector-2. It was the sector supervised by Khaled Mosharraf and Rashid Haider. After his training he came to Dhaka to join the Crack Platoon, a group that conducted major guerrilla operations against the Pakistan Army. His major target was to bomb the Siddhirganj Power Station. Rumi participated in hit and run attacks, including the shooting of police guards outside a house Dhanmondi Road 18 that led to his capture, detention and demise.
In the Dhanmondi operation, Rumi and his friends carried out a successful assault on the Pakistanis, shooting and killing soldiers from the back window of a black Morris Oxford and then giving the pursuers the slip. The whole street of Dhanmondi gentry celebrated it.

Arrest by Pakistan Army and aftermath
After his operation he became an icon to his fellow warriors. He stayed the night of 29 August 1971 to his house, the night when Pakistan Army caught most of the guerrilla fighters based on their information from an unknown source. His father, younger brother and a cousin were also arrested with him by the Pakistan Army , led by a Captain Quayyum. They were first taken to the intersect of Mirpur Road and Elephant road. There they were lined up in front of a military jeep and intelligence officers identified each of them by throwing headlights on the faces. Among all Rumi was separated and took to a military vehicle while Sharif with other arrested family members got in their family car. Sharif himself was driving and was accompanied by two armed military personnel, was following the military convoy. Later Rumi told to his father in detention that in that vehicle Rumi was accompanied by almost all the freedom fighters he fought with days prior to the arrest. However, from Elephant Road they were taken to Ramna Police Station where a new series of identification took place. From there the military convoy headed to Dhaka Cantonment, this time too Sharif was driving as a part of the convoy though was one of the detainees. In Dhaka Cantonment army tortured both Rumi and others seriously and kept them in a small room somewhere near or inside a hostel in the cantonment. There they were accompanied by many other victims of that night including artist Altaf Mahmud, Abul Barak and Rumi's colleague Azad, Jewel and others. In that room Rumi explained to his brother Jami that army already are fully aware of his operations and he and his colleague Bodi took the full responsibly of the attacks. He advised Sharif and Jami to give the same statements and to tell the army that the family (of Rumi) were completely unaware of his activities.

Rumi's cousin, who was arrested with them, was freed on 2 September 1971 reportedly because he was able to show a bus ticket which incidentally was in his pocket and proved him not be a permanent resident of Rumi's residence. Sharif, Jami were cut loose two days later on 4 September. They returned with harrowing tales of torture. Sharif, exhausted from tiredness and injured from severe torture, drove his car to his Elephant Road residence. Rumi with others of his co-fighters Bodi, Jewel and others, were later never found, assumably became one of the hundreds of thousands of people massacred by the military junta. Some sources claim that a number of arrested freedom fighters were executed at midnight of 4 September and Rumi had been one of them. Among the captured, Chullu, one of Rumi's valiant co-fighters, was confined in the Central Jail of Dhaka, from where he was rescued by a group of sector-2 freedom fighters after the allied forces occupied Dhaka on 16 December.

As Rumi along with his co-fighters had been acting as the key masterminds of Dhaka metropolitan oriented guerrilla warfare to that date and among them almost all then staying in Dhaka were captured on days around 29 August, the crackdown appeared as a temporary halt to Mukti Bahini operations in Dhaka . Later, though the Sector 2 commander Maj. Khaled Mosharraf had to largely curtail his Dhaka supplies because of intensifying frontier conflicts, by the end of September the capital again started being shaken by frequent guerrilla attacks on military units and bombing on key locations, and this time it continued almost up to the Pakistani surrender in December later that year.

As Yahya Khan was set to announce mass mercy on 5 September 1971 many family relatives instated to ask mercy petition for Rumi to the government. Rumi's parents took the suggestion and thought over it but later decided to not do so because they considered it to be a dishonor to Rumi's views and ideology.

Rumi's father Engr. Sharif Imam underwent a massive heart-attack on 13 December 1971, was rushed to IPGMR (popularly known as PG hospital), where he died at late night because the defibrillator couldn't be used due to a blackout being carried out as an official Indo-Pak war had started a week ago.

Verdict for killing Rumi
On 18 July 2013, Ali Ahsan Mohammad Mojaheed was found guilty and received life sentence on the charge related to the killing of Rumi along with Badi, Jewel, Azad and Altaf Mahmud at the army camp set up in Nakhalpara, Dhaka, during the Liberation War.

In popular culture
In 2022, Pakistan's Geo Entertainment diffused the period drama Jo Bichar Gaye about the Bangladesh Liberation War and one of the main characters was Rumi, who was played by Wahaj Ali.

References

External links
 short biography at International Coalition at Historic sites and Conscience

1952 births
1971 deaths
Bangladeshi activists
People killed in the Bangladesh Liberation War
Mukti Bahini personnel
Recipients of the Bir Bikrom